The 1902 Indiana Hoosiers football team was an American football team that represented Indiana University Bloomington during the 1902 Western Conference football season. In their fifth season under head coach James H. Horne, the Hoosiers compiled a 3–5–1 record and were outscored by their opponents by a combined total of 207 to 94.

Schedule

References

Indiana
Indiana Hoosiers football seasons
Indiana Hoosiers football